Manoj Sinha (born 1 July 1959) is an Indian politician serving as the 2nd and the current Lieutenant Governor of Jammu and Kashmir. He served as the Minister of State (Independent Charge) for Communications and Minister of State for Railways in the Government of India. Sinha was elected as Member of Parliament in the Lok Sabha, representing Ghazipur for three terms from the Bharatiya Janata Party. Sinha was in the race for the post of UP Chief Minister after 2017 Uttar Pradesh Legislative Assembly election.

Early life and education 
He was born in a Bhumihar brahmin family. He has a B.Tech And M.Tech degree in Civil Engineering from the Indian Institute of Technology (BHU) Varanasi (earlier called IT-BHU). During his student days, Sinha was the students' union president in the Banaras Hindu University.

Political career 
His political career began when he was elected as the president of Banaras Hindu University Students Union in 1982. He was elected to the Lok Sabha for the first time in 1996 and repeated the term in 1999. Sinha has been a member of the BJP national council from 1989 to 1996. He was elected to the Lower House for a third term in national politics when the BJP swept the Lok Sabha elections in 2014.

Prior to joining active politics, he was a member of the General Council, School of Planning during 1999–2000. He has also been a member of committee on Energy and member of committee on Government Assurances.

He was inducted as a member of the BJP National Council in 1989. He was elected for successive terms in 1996 & 1999 and again in 2014 to the Lok Sabha from Ghazipur Constituency in Uttar Pradesh. He was made the Minister of State for the Railways Ministry in the first set of ministers inducted into Narendra Modi government in May 2014. In July 2016, during the second cabinet reshuffle, he was also made Minister of State (Independent Charge) of the Communications Ministry.

An agriculturalist at heart and a silent performer who consciously maintains a low profile, Sinha has been among the best performing members of Parliament in the 13th Lok Sabha in 1999.

Recently, he was counted among the seven most honest MPs by a leading magazine. Sinha, a civil engineer and an IIT-BHU alumnus, has set a rare example by utilising his entire MPLAD Fund for the welfare of the people of his constituency.

He is both recognised for a strong ability to connect with masses, especially at the rural level along with being a firm administrator.

As Lieutenant Governor of Jammu and Kashmir 
Manoj Sinha was appointed as the Lieutenant Governor of Jammu and Kashmir by the President of India, a day after G. C. Murmu resigned. On 7 August 2020, Sinha completed his oath of office.

Personal life 
Manoj Sinha married Ms. Neelam Sinha on 8 May 1977. They have a daughter and a son.

References

|-

|-

|-

|-

|-

1959 births
Living people
Bharatiya Janata Party politicians from Uttar Pradesh
People from Ghazipur 
Banaras Hindu University alumni
India MPs 1999–2004
Lok Sabha members from Uttar Pradesh
India MPs 2014–2019
Politicians from Ghazipur
Narendra Modi ministry
India MPs 1996–1997
Lieutenant Governors of Jammu and Kashmir